JSDoc is a markup language used to annotate JavaScript source code files. Using comments containing JSDoc, programmers can add documentation describing the application programming interface of the code they're creating. This is then processed, by various tools, to produce documentation in accessible formats like HTML and Rich Text Format. The JSDoc specification is released under CC BY-SA 3.0, while its companion documentation generator and parser library is free software under the Apache License 2.0.

History 
JSDoc's syntax and semantics are similar to those of the Javadoc scheme, which is used for documenting code written in Java. JSDoc differs from Javadoc, in that it is specialized to handle JavaScript's dynamic behaviour.

An early example using a Javadoc-like syntax to document JavaScript was released in 1999 with the Netscape/Mozilla project Rhino, a JavaScript run-time system written in Java. It included a toy "JSDoc" HTML generator, versioned up to 1.3, as an example of its JavaScript capabilities.

All main generations of "JSDoc" were headed by micmaths (Michael Mathews). He started with JSDoc.pm in 2001, a simple system written in Perl, in cooperation with Canadian programmer Gabriel Reid. It was hosted on SourceForge in a CVS repository. By JSDoc 1.0 (2007) he rewrote the system in JavaScript (again for Rhino), and after a set of expansions JSDoc 2.0 (2008) gained the name "jsdoc-toolkit". Released under the MIT License, it was hosted in a Subversion repository on Google Code. By 2011 he has refactored the system into JSDoc 3.0 and hosted the result on GitHub. It now runs on Node.js.

JSDoc tags 
Some of the more popular annotation tags used in modern JSDoc are:

{| class="wikitable"
! Tag        !! Description
|-
|@author     || Developer's name
|-
|@constructor|| Marks a function as a constructor
|-
|@deprecated || Marks a method as deprecated
|-
|@exception  || Synonym for @throws
|-
|@exports    || Identifies a member that is exported by the module
|-
|@param      || Documents a method parameter; a datatype indicator can be added between curly braces 
|-
|@private    || Signifies that a member is private
|-
|@returns     || Documents a return value
|-
|@return    || Synonym for @returns
|-
|@see        || Documents an association to another object
|-
|@todo       || Documents something that is missing/open
|-
|@this       || Specifies the type of the object to which the keyword this refers within a function. 
|-
|@throws     || Documents an exception thrown by a method
|-
|@version    || Provides the version number of a library
|}

Example 
/** @class Circle representing a circle. */
class Circle {
  /**
   * Creates an instance of Circle.
   *
   * @author: moi
   * @param {number} r The desired radius of the circle.
   */
  constructor(r) {
    /** @private */ this.radius = r
    /** @private */ this.circumference = 2 * Math.PI * r
  }

  /**
   * Creates a new Circle from a diameter.
   *
   * @param {number} d The desired diameter of the circle.
   * @return {Circle} The new Circle object.
   */
  static fromDiameter(d) {
    return new Circle(d / 2)
  }

  /**
   * Calculates the circumference of the Circle.
   *
   * @deprecated since 1.1.0; use getCircumference instead
   * @return {number} The circumference of the circle.
   */
  calculateCircumference() {
    return 2 * Math.PI * this.radius
  }

  /**
   * Returns the pre-computed circumference of the Circle.
   *
   * @return {number} The circumference of the circle.
   * @since 1.1.0
   */
  getCircumference() {
    return this.circumference
  }

  /**
   * Find a String representation of the Circle.
   *
   * @override
   * @return {string} Human-readable representation of this Circle.
   */
  toString() {
    return `[A Circle object with radius of ${this.radius}.]`
  }
}

/**
 * Prints a circle.
 *
 * @param {Circle} circle
 */
function printCircle(circle) {
    /** @this {Circle} */
    function bound() { console.log(this) }
    bound.apply(circle)
}

JSDoc in use 
 Google's Closure Linter and Closure Compiler. The latter extracts the type information to optimize its output JavaScript.
 TypeScript can perform type checking for JavaScript files with JSDoc type annotations. Microsoft has specified a new TSDoc language with extensible tags.
 Popular editor Sublime Text supports JSDoc through the DocBlockr or DoxyDoxygen plugin
 The JSDoc syntax has been described at length in the Apress book Foundations of Ajax .
 IntelliJ IDEA, NetBeans, Visual Studio Code and RubyMine understand JSDoc syntax.
 Eclipse-based Aptana Studio supports ScriptDoc.
 Mozile , the Mozilla Inline Editor uses JSDoc.pm.
 The Helma application framework uses JSDoc.
 SproutCore documentation was generated using JSDoc. 
 Visual Studio, WebStorm and many other Integrated development environments or Text Editors offer Code Completion and other assistance based on JSDoc comments.
 Open source Atom editor supports JSDoc via the atom-easy-jsdoc plugin.

See also 
 Comparison of documentation generators
 Google Closure Tools

References

External links 
 Official JSDoc Website, for tutorials and docs on usage
 Official JSDoc Github, for up-to-date code
 "Annotating JavaScript for the Closure Compiler", Closure Tools documentation, Google Developer website

Free documentation generators
JavaScript programming tools